A Mahajana refers to one the twelve beings of spiritual authority affiliated with the Hindu deity Vishnu, who are described to teach religious ideal, and who, by his conduct, sets an example for others to follow.

Literature 
The Bhagavata Purana (6.3.20-21) lists twelve Mahajanas, regarded to be the greatest devotees of Vishnu: Brahma, Narada, Shiva, the Four Kumaras, Kapila, Svayambhuva Manu, Prahlada, Janaka, Bhishma, Bali, Śuka, and Yama.

References

Characters in Hindu mythology
Vishnu